Gotl or GOTL may refer to:
a surname (such as with Bela Gotl, coach for the Libyan squad in the 1982 African Cup of Nations)
Government of Timor-Leste (see Foreign aid to East Timor)
Guardians of the Legend
Pertaining to Efrain Chacurian